Amrita Schools of Business are private business schools of Amrita Vishwa Vidyapeetham University in India, which is spread across its five campuses in Amritapuri (Kollam), Bengaluru, Kochi, Coimbatore and Amaravati.  The schools offer full-time MBA program, MBA-MS program, management-related doctoral programs, and many executive and online education programs.

Admission to Master of Business Administration degree is through Common Admission Test, Management Aptitude Test, Common Management Admission Test and Graduate Management Admission Test.

The schools were founded by Mata Amritanandamayi Devi in 1996, and are managed by her international humanitarian organization Mata Amritanandamayi Math.

History 
The Amrita School of Business, Coimbatore was established in 1996, in the village of Ettimadai at the foothills of Bouluvanpatty ranges, about 20 km away from the Coimbatore city. As Amrita's first campus, it is still home to the administrative headquarters of Amrita University.

Currently, the university has schools of business in 5 of its 7 campuses

In 2022, a business school started operating in its new campus at Amaravati, the capital city of Andhra Pradesh.

Campuses

Amrita School of Business, Coimbatore 

The school of Business in the Coimbatore campus started in 1996. Being the headquarters of the university, it has the largest intake of students annually, and offers and full time MBA and doctoral courses. This campus also houses the IBM Business Analytics Lab.

Amrita School of Business, Bengaluru 
The school of Business in the Bengaluru campus offers two management programs, a full-time MBA-MS. and a part-time Executive MBA-MS in Business Analytics with University at Buffalo. It also offers doctoral programs.

Amrita School of Business, Kochi 
The school of Business in the Kochi campus is started functioning in 1998. It offers full-time MBA and doctoral programs.

Amrita School of Business, Amritapuri Kollam 
The school of Business in the Amritapuri campus started in 2002. It offers and full time MBA and doctoral courses.

The schools also offers UGC approved online BBA, MBA, MA and other management courses.

Amrita School of Business, Amaravati 
The school of Business in the Amaravati campus started in 2022. It offers and full time BBA, MBA and doctoral courses.

Rankings 

Amrita Vishwa Vidyapeetham was ranked 801–1000 in the world by the Times Higher Education World University Rankings of 2021 The QS World University Rankings of 2020 ranked it in 261–270 band in Asia. Amrita Vishwa Vidyapeetham of which Amrita Schools of Business is a constituent part, has been ranked 151-200 according to QS ranking of BRICS universities. It was ranked 5th best in India among universities by the National Institutional Ranking Framework in 2021. The Government of India awarded Institute of Eminence status to the university. The university is also accredited with A++ by NAAC.

Amrita School of Business, Coimbatore was ranked as 19th in the Top private B-schools in India by careers360 magazine for the year 2014. Amrita School of Business, Coimbatore was selected as one of the best b-schools of Asia in 2014 by Newsweek.

Academics

Academic programmes 
The school offers BBA, MBA, PhD and online courses in management. In addition, it offers a dual degree program leading to an MS in information technology and MBA in collaboration with State University of New York at Buffalo, for working professionals at the Bangalore campus.

The school also emphasizes on Sustainable Development, Business Ethics and Social Responsibility. The university has collaborations with many foreign universities including the University of California.

Curriculum 
Curriculum at Amrita Schools of Business is created by its Academic Council based on the intellectual contributions of Industry experts, Academic researches, Faculty, Alumnus and industry expectations.

The school in Coimbatore houses the IBM Business Analytics Lab which was inaugurated by Mr. Kaushik Bhaskar, Vice President of Information Integration & Governance Software and India Software Labs IBM India.

Admission 
Admission to Master of Business Administration degree is through score in Common Admission Test, Management Aptitude Test, Common Management Admission Test or Graduate Management Admission Test and interview. Admission for online courses is based on score in qualifying examination.

Scholarships 
The schools also offer scholarship based on Common Admission Test, Management Aptitude Test, Common Management Admission Test and Graduate Management Admission Test scores.

References 

Business schools in India
1996 establishments in India
Universities and colleges affiliated with the Mata Amritanandamayi Math
Business schools in Kerala
Business schools in Tamil Nadu
Business schools in Karnataka